Maud Rockefeller's Bet is a 1924 German silent comedy film directed by Erich Eriksen and starring Rita Clermont, Karl Elzer and Erich Kaiser-Titz.

Cast
In alphabetical order
 Rita Clermont as Maud
 Karl Elzer as John Rockefeller
 Erich Kaiser-Titz as Mac Williams
 Vera Skidelsky as Alice
 Kurt Vespermann as Bill Wellwood

References

Bibliography
 Grange, William. Cultural Chronicle of the Weimar Republic. Scarecrow Press, 2008.

External links

1924 films
Films of the Weimar Republic
Films directed by Erich Eriksen
German silent feature films
1924 comedy films
German comedy films
German black-and-white films
National Film films
Silent comedy films
1920s German films